The Henry Clay Moss House is a historic house located at 414 N. Main St. in Paris, Illinois. The Italianate house was built in 1876 for local businessman Henry Clay Moss. The home features a wraparound porch supported by columns, a hipped roof with a bracketed cornice, and a projecting hexagonal bay on its west side. The interior of the home includes home office space and features decorative wooden door and window surrounds and trim as well as a cantilevered flight of stairs. Moss lost the house in 1877, and it passed through a succession of owners until livestock breeder Daniel Arthur bought the home in 1895; the home remained in the Arthur family until 1976.

The house was added to the National Register of Historic Places on April 16, 2008. The Edgar County Historical Society currently operates a museum in the home.

References

External links
Edgar County Historical Society

Historic house museums in Illinois
Houses completed in 1876
Houses on the National Register of Historic Places in Illinois
Italianate architecture in Illinois
National Register of Historic Places in Edgar County, Illinois
Houses in Edgar County, Illinois
Museums in Edgar County, Illinois